Proposal(s) or The Proposal may refer to:
 Proposal (business)
 Research proposal
 Proposal (marriage)
 Proposition, a proposal in logic and philosophy

Arts, entertainment, and media
 The Proposal (album)

Films
 The Proposal (1957 film), an Australian television play based on Chekhov's 1890 play
 The Proposal (2001 film), starring Nick Moran, Jennifer Esposito, and Stephen Lang
 The Proposal (2009 film), starring Sandra Bullock and Ryan Reynolds
 The Proposal (2022 film), starring Joe Joseph and Amara Raja
 "La propuesta" ("The Proposal"), a short story in the 2014 Argentina anthology film Wild Tales

Literature
 Proposals (play), a 1997 play by Neil Simon
 The Proposal (novel), 1999 and 35th book in the Animorphs series by K.A. Applegate
 The Proposal, alternative title of Chekhov's 1890 play A Marriage Proposal

Television
 The Proposal (American TV series), a 2018 reality dating series
 The Proposal (Australian TV series), based on the American series
 "The Proposal", the title of three Dynasty episodes:
 "The Proposal" (Dynasty 1983)
 "The Proposal" (Dynasty 1985)
 "The Proposal" (Dynasty 1988)
 "The Proposal" (Frasier), a 2002 episode from the ninth season of Frasier
 "The Proposal" (The O.C.), a 2004 episode from The O.C. television show

See also
 :Category:Lists of proposals
 
 
 Government proposal (disambiguation)
 Proposal 2 (disambiguation)
 Proposal Rock (disambiguation)